Philip Warwick (1640–1683) was a British diplomat.

He was the only son of Sir Philip Warwick (1609–1683), the English writer and politician.

The younger Philip was probably admitted to the Inner Temple in 1656.  In 1680, he was appointed as British envoy extraordinary to Sweden (to represent the subjects of all three British kingdoms), arriving in 1680.  His diplomatic business was mainly concerned with trade, the possible renewal of a commercial treaty, and problems encountered by individual merchants.

In January 1683, he obtained leave to return to England to deal with family affairs, leaving his secretary Dr John Robinson as Chargé d'Affaires.  However, he died in March at Newmarket with the result that Robinson succeeded as envoy.

References
A. N. L. Grosjean, ‘Warwick, Philip (bap. 1640, d. 1683)’, Oxford Dictionary of National Biography, Oxford University Press, 2004 , accessed 18 April 2009.

1640 births
1683 deaths
Members of the Inner Temple
Ambassadors of England to Sweden
17th-century English diplomats